Julie Halard-Decugis and Corina Morariu were the defending champions, but none competed this year. Halard-Decugis retired from professional tennis at the end of the 2000 season, while Morariu was forced to leave the Tour after being diagnosed with leukemia.

Liezel Huber and Rachel McQuillan won the title by defeating Janet Lee and Wynne Prakusya 6–2, 6–0 in the final. It was the 2nd title for Huber and the 16th title for McQuillan in their respective doubles careers.

Seeds

Draw

Draw

References
 ITF tournament profile

Women's Doubles
2001 WTA Tour